James Williamson (1811 – 8 March 1881) was a pastoralist and politician in colonial Australia, a member of the New South Wales Legislative Council, and later, the New South Wales Legislative Assembly.

Williamson was born in Edinburgh, Scotland, and arrived in Sydney around 1837. Williamson was elected to the New South Wales Legislative Council as member for District of Port Phillip on 1 September 1848, a position he held until 31 January 1849. Williamson was elected to the New South Wales Legislative Assembly as member for Electoral district of Gloucester and Macquarie on 10 February 1858, holding the seat until 11 April 1859.

Williamson died in Burwood, New South Wales, on 8 March 1881.

References

 

1811 births
1881 deaths
Australian pastoralists
Members of the New South Wales Legislative Council
Members of the New South Wales Legislative Assembly
Scottish emigrants to Australia
19th-century Australian politicians
19th-century Australian businesspeople